Sarhua is a district in the western Víctor Fajardo Province in Ayacucho, Peru. It is bordered by Vilcanchos District on the west, Totos District (Cangallo Province) on the north, Huamanquiquia District on the east, and   Santiago de Lucanamarca District (Huanca Sancos Province) on the south.

Geography 
Some of the highest mountains of the district are listed below:

Ethnic groups 
The people in the district are mainly indigenous citizens of Quechua descent. Quechua is the language which the majority of the population (98.00%) learnt to speak in childhood, 1.90% of the residents started speaking using the Spanish language (2007 Peru Census).

See also 
 Pukara

References

External links

  Municipalidad Distrital de Sarhua
  Sarhua Arte y decoración contemporáneo hecho a mano.
  Comunidad de Sarhua Actualidad del Pueblo de Sarhua
  Sarhua - Víctor Fajardo Ayacucho Acerca de la cultura de Sarhua y Ayacucho
  Artesanos de Sarhua